The 1970 Thomas Cup was the eighth tournament of Thomas Cup, the most important men's badminton team competition in the world. The final set of ties (team matches) were held in Kuala Lumpur, Malaysia.

Indonesia won its fourth title after beating Malaysia in the Final Round.

Teams
25 teams took part in the competition, 3 of them in the Australasian Zone, 8 in the Asian Zone, 9 in the European Zone and 5 in the Pan American Zone. As defending champion, Malaysia received a bye through the zone qualifications and the first round of Inter-zone ties, and played directly in the second round of inter-zone ties (the semifinal round of the entire tournament).

Australasian Zone

Asian Zone

European Zone

Panamerican Zone

Qualifications

Australasian zone

First round

Final round

Asian zone

Final round

European zone

First round

Second round

Third round

Final round

Panamerican zone

First round

Second round

Final round

Summary of qualification (Intra-zone) ties
New Zealand, led by the Purser brothers, Richard and Bryan, won the Australasian Zone for the  first time by beating Australia (8-1) and Singapore (7-2). Denmark again prevailed in the European Zone. Its closest tie came in the zone semifinal against England which the Danes won six matches to three, thanks largely to Svend Pri's three victories. Three wins by Jamie Paulson were also instrumental in Canada's first ever victory (6–3) over the USA in the Pan American zone.
    
The greatest drama came in the Asian Zone which contained several of the strongest teams in the entire competition. Indonesia, fighting to regain the cup that it had relinquished in 1967, began its quest by defeating India (7-2). It then became embroiled in yet another highly controversial tie, but this time one in which Indonesia, rather than its opponent nation, claimed to be the victim of partisanship. Facing Thailand in Bangkok, up three matches to two, Indonesia removed its player (Muljadi) from the court during the first game of the sixth match and refused to continue. Though Thailand was initially awarded the tie, 6-3, the IBF upheld an Indonesian protest and ordered the tie to be continued, at three matches each in Japan, where the zone final was scheduled to be played.  When Thailand refused to comply, Indonesia was awarded the match (6-3). In the zone final Indonesia   faced a Japanese team which boasted one of the strongest lineups of singles players (Ippei Kojima, Masao Akiyama, and Junji Honma) in the tournament. Indonesia finally prevailed (5-4), largely because of Rudy Hartono's four victories.

Inter-zone playoffs 

Prior to the 1969-1970 Thomas Cup series the defending champion nation had been exempt from earlier play, needing only to defeat a challenger in a single, conclusive challenge round tie. Beginning with this series, however, the defending champion received a bye only to an inter-zone semifinal tie, needing to win this contest and the inter-zone final in order to retain the Cup. Malaysia, defending its title at home in Kuala Lumpur, drew a Danish team which was missing two of its leading "regulars." The veteran Erland Kops, highly critical of the IBF's (BWF's) decision to sustain Indonesia's protest against Thailand (see Intra-zone summary above), declined to play in further Thomas Cup contests. For reasons less clear, Denmark's top singles player Svend Pri was also unavailable. Nevertheless, Malaysia had great difficulty against a group of opponents who seemed to be less affected by the tropical heat and humidity than previous Danish squads had been. Playing first singles for Denmark, the talented Elo Hansen stunned both Tan Aik Huang and "Punch" Gunalan in straight game, while the veteran Henning Borch outlasted Abdul Rahman in the third singles match. Malaysia managed to scrape home 5–4  by taking three of the four doubles matches and both singles against the Danish number two. Gunalan atoned for his loss to Hansen by decisively winning his remaining singles and doubles.

In the other half of the draw, Indonesia, having barely survived the Asian zone qualification, coasted through two ties against first time inter-zone participants. It beat New Zealand without the loss of a match or a game, and Canada with almost equal ease. In eight singles games against Rudy Hartono and Muljadi, Canada's Jamie Paulson and Wayne Macdonnell could aggregate only 21 points.

First round

Second round

Final round summary

Malaysia's struggle on its home courts against Denmark had boded badly for its chances against Indonesia, but the relative ease of Indonesia's victory in the final still surprised many observers. Indonesia captured five of the first six matches, including all four at the first two singles positions, to wrest the Cup from Malaysia. Though "Punch" Gunalan was Malaysia's strongest all-around player at this time, he was also (at the comparatively late age of 26) a Thomas Cup rookie, and nerves may have played a role in his tame lead-off loss to the veteran Muljadi. He won the first of his doubles matches with the redoubtable Ng Boon Bee and extended Rudy Hartono to three games in the fifth match of the tie, but the potential three wins which might have been expected from Gunalan's racket did not materialize. Indonesia regained the title by a final score of 7–2, in one of the very few Thomas Cup occasions that a team has had much more difficulty in qualifying for the final set of ties than in winning it. Again, Hartono won all four of his matches.

Final round

References

External links 
 tangkis.tripod.com
 Mike's Badminton Populorum 

Thomas Cup
Thomas Cup
Thomas & Uber Cup
Badminton tournaments in Malaysia
1970 in Malaysian sport